The Barnstable Public School District oversees the operation all public schools in Barnstable, Massachusetts, United States. The Superintendent of Schools is Meg Mayo-Brown. The Assistant Superintendent is Kristen Harmon.

History
Although it is unknown when the school district started, it is generally believed to have been in existence by the early 1900s.

2001 and 2003 Overrides Fail
In 2001, a Proposition  override failed to pass. In addition to teacher cuts across the system and reductions in each school's budget, the most significant losses were to the schools' award-winning music program; elementary school feeder programs were cut completely. In 2002 the district faced another budget shortfall and the school committee voted to implement fees for bus transportation, music programs and sports programs. A 2003 override was attempted to remove these fees and prevent further staff lay-offs. The override failed and the fees remained. The loss of feeder music programs in 2001 and the subsequent fees for participation in the high school music program decimated the award-winning Barnstable High School Marching Band.

Fitzgerald v. Barnstable School Committee
In 2001, the school committee was sued under the court case Fitzgerald v. Barnstable School Committee. The case went all the way to the U.S. Supreme Court, which ruled that parents could sue school committees for sexual harassment under the Fourteenth Amendment. The $3,000,000 suit was eventually settled for $150,000.

2008 Budget Crisis
With the Late-2000s recession, the state was forced to cut $6,000,000 in local aid. Faced with serious budgetary constraints, the School Committee opted to go with their third option, which entailed closing three elementary schools, moving the fourth and fifth grades into Barnstable United Elementary School (formerly Barnstable Horace Mann Charter Public School), moving the sixth and seventh grades into Barnstable Intermediate School (formerly Barnstable Middle School), and moving the eighth grade into Barnstable High School. The School Committee chose to close Cotuit Elementary School, Marstons Mills Elementary School, and Osterville Bay Elementary School in 2008. To date, only Cotuit Elementary School has been re-purposed by the Waldorf School of Cape Cod, but returned to vacancy in 2019 after the Waldorf School fell behind in rent payments and the lease was revoked. Osterville Bay Elementary was demolished in 2017. Marstons Mills Elementary remains vacant and has fallen into disrepair.

Schools

Active

Barnstable Intermediate School

Barnstable Intermediate School is a combination elementary/middle school (Grades 6-7). It is located on Route 28 in the village of Hyannis.

Originally named Barnstable Middle School from 1976–1992, the school changed its name to Barnstable Middle School at Hyannis because of the building of a middle school in Marstons Mills. The school reverted to its original name in 2003 after the school system was reorganized. In 2009, with another reorganization, the school was named the Barnstable Intermediate School to reflect the addition of the 6th grade and the loss of the 8th graders. When the school was called BMS, the seventh grade was primarily educated in English, Social Studies, Science, and Math (Course 2 or Pre-Algebra). The eighth grade was primarily educated in English, Social Studies, Science and Math (Pre-Algebra or Algebra 1). Some of the enrichment classes offered were Physical Education, Health, Art, Band, Orchestra, Chorus, French/Conversational French, Technical Education, Music, Applied Math, Gateway, and other groups/organizations/classes.

Notable attendees
Siobhan Magnus, singer, former American Idol contestant

Other active schools

 Barnstable High School (Grades 8-12)
 Barnstable United Elementary School (Grades 4-5)
 Barnstable/West Barnstable Elementary School  (Grades K-3)
 Centerville Elementary School (Grades K-3)
 Barnstable Community Innovation School (Formerly Hyannis East Elementary School) (Grades K-3)
 Hyannis West Elementary School (Grades K-3)
 West Villages Elementary School (Grades K-3)
 The Enoch Cobb Early Learning Center (Preschool)

Inactive Buildings
 Barnstable High School (Old Building)
 Barnstable Horace Mann Charter Public School (1920-2014)
 Barnstable Middle School (Old Building)
 Barnstable Village Schoolhouse (1854-?)
 Cotuit Elementary School
 Elizabeth Lowell High School(): a former public high school (grades 9-12) operated by the school district and closed in the early 1930s as the newly expanded Barnstable High School had the capacity for the former students of the school.
 Marstons Mills Elementary School
 Osterville Bay Elementary School (1915-June 17, 2008)
 Osterville Grammar School
 West Barnstable Village Schoolhouse (1854-?)

References

External links
 
Barnstable Middle School

Barnstable, Massachusetts
School districts in Massachusetts
Education in Barnstable County, Massachusetts